The Melodeon (1839 - ca.1870) was a concert hall and performance space in 19th-century Boston, Massachusetts, located on Washington Street, near West Street. Musical concerts, lectures, sermons, conferences, visual displays, and popular entertainments occurred there.

History 

The Melodeon occupied the building of the former Lion Theatre (1836–1839) and Mechanics Institute (1839).

Proprietors of the Melodeon included the Handel and Haydn Society (1839); Leander Rodney (1844); Boston Theatre Company (1852); E. Warden (1857; temporarily renamed The Melodeon Varieties); Charles Francis Adams (1859).

Performances & events

1830s-1840s 
 1839
 Handel and Haydn Society.
 1840
 "Soiree musicale. The celebrated Rainer Family, or Tyrolese minstrels."
 1842
 Amateur concert for the benefit of the Warren Street Chapel.
 Mr. Braham.
 1843
 Vocal entertainment by H. Russell.
 Rossini's Stabat Mater, with Handel and Haydn Society.
 Dr. Lardner
 1844
 Concert by Ole Bull, assisted by Miss Stone, Mr. Herwig, Mr. Hayter, and a full orchestra.
 Henry Phillips, assisted by Miss Stone.
 William Charles Macready, Charlotte Cushman.
 1845
 Massachusetts Charitable Mechanic Association 13th triennial festival, 1st semi-centennial celebration.
 Musical entertainment by Mr. Dempster.
 1846
 Haydn's The Creation, performed by the Handel and Haydn Society.
 Hutchinson Family.
 Concert by C. Sivori.
 1848
 Steyermarkische Musical Company.
 1849
 Madame Biscaccianti and Strakosch.
 Services on the occasion of the decease of the late president, James K. Polk.
 Sermon of the Spiritual Condition of Boston, preached by Theodore Parker.

1850s 
 1850
 Annetta Stephani.
 Handel's Jeptha, with Boston Musical Education Society.
 "Optical wonders. Whipple's grand exhibition of dissolving views! Magnifiying daguerreotypes, kaleidoscope pictures, & pyramic fires."
 1852
 "Professor Anderson, the wizard of the North"
 Handel's Samson, with Handel and Haydn Society.
 Donetti's Comic Troupe of Acting Monkeys
 Germania Musical Society
 1854
 Magician Macallister.
 "Splendid mirror of North and South America"; presented by J. Perham.
 "Italia", panorama by Waugh.
 1855
 J. H. Siddons.
 Josiah Perham's Ethiopian Troupe and Great Burlesque Company.
 New England Anti-Slavery Convention.
 William Makepeace Thackeray
 1857
 Lola Montez.
 1858
 The Bunyan Tableaux.
 Orpheus Glee Club, Lucy A. Doane, Hugo Leonhard.
 1859
 Melodeon Minstrels.

1860s 
 1860
 Parlor operas, with Mr. & Mrs. Henri Drayton.
 1862
 French Zouaves.
 Stereopticon.
 M. Lizzie Bell, Agnes A. Kenney.
 "Master Rentz's second annual subscription concert," with the Mendelssohn Quintette Club, Adeline S. Washburn.
 Louis Moreau Gottschalk playing works by Chopin and Henselt.
 1864
 Arthur Cheney, H.C. Barnabee, John F. Pray.
 Morton's The angel of the attic.
 1865
 A. Bronson Alcott

References 

Music venues in Boston
Former buildings and structures in Boston
Former theatres in Boston
Cultural history of Boston
19th century in Boston
Financial District, Boston
Boston Theater District
1839 establishments in Massachusetts